Break the Records: By You & For You (stylized as Break the Records -by you & for you-) is the fourth studio album by Japanese boy band KAT-TUN and was released in Japan on April 29, 2009 by J-One Records. The album was released in two editions: a limited edition version with a 36-page photo booklet included and a regular edition which features the bonus track, "Moon".

It was the last album to feature Jin Akanishi.

Content
Fourth album release from KAT-TUN including the songs "Don't U Ever Stop," "White X'mas (album version)," "One Drop," "Rescue," and more for 15 songs total. Regular edition includes one bonus track "Moon". Limited Edition includes special booklet.  Features alternate jacket artwork. Adam Greenburg on Allmusic gave the album three out of five stars, stating that "this [album] probably isn't the best KAT-TUN album by any measure, but it shows a lot of incremental gains in ability and composition over previous efforts. The rawest energy and emotion captured by the band in some other releases may not always be present, but on Break the Records KAT-TUN nevertheless take a lot of steps in the right direction toward being a more mature band."

Track listing

Chart positions
RIAJ certified Break the Records: By You & For You platinum denoting more than 250,000 shipments by September 2009.

Certifications

References

KAT-TUN albums
2009 albums